Felix Smeets (29 April 1904 – 14 March 1961) was a Dutch footballer who earned 14 caps for the Dutch national side between 1927 and 1927, scoring 7 goals. He was also part of the Netherlands squad at the 1928 Summer Olympics, but did not play in any matches.

References

External links
Player profile at FIFA
 Player profile at VoetbalStats.nl
 Player profile at Weltfußball.de
  Geschiedenis van HBS Haagse Voetbal-, Cricket- en Hockeyvereniging "HOUDT BRAEF STANT"

1904 births
1961 deaths
Dutch footballers
Netherlands international footballers
Olympic footballers of the Netherlands
Footballers at the 1928 Summer Olympics
Footballers from The Hague
HBS Craeyenhout players
Association football forwards